The Boston Militia was an outdoor lacrosse team in the short lived American Lacrosse League formed in 1988. The Militia played their home games at Ellis Oval on the campus of Tufts University. The general manager for the Militia was Chris Harvey and the head coach was David Hill. The Militia compiled a record of two wins and two losses before the American Lacrosse league ceased operation due to financial difficulties. Some of the Militia's notable players were Barry Fraser, Bruce Chanenchuk and goalie Dan O'Neill.

The complete roster of the Militia was as follows:

 4 Steve Glover (UNH) Attack
 7 John Gower (Ohio Wesleyan University) Mid
 9 Greg Fisk (U Mass) Mid
 10 Steve Giatrelis (UNH) Attack/Mid
 12 Bill Bergan (Hobart) Mid
 13 Bruce Chanenchuck (Johns Hopkins) Mid
 14 Tom Gagnon (Brown)Attack
 15 Tom Carmean (U Mass) Attack
 16 Greg Canella (U Mass) Attack
 17 Dave Desko (Syracuse) Mid
 18 Karl Hatton (U Mass) Mid
 19 Steve Heffernan (Brown) Mid
 20 Paul Fogarty (U Mass) Mid
 21 Barry Cain (U Mass) Defense
 22 Tim Schurr (Washington & Lee) Defense
 23 John Fenton (Brown) Defense
 24 Ray Cozzi (U Mass) Defense
 25 Micahel Higgins (Cornell) Defense
 26 Andy Soma (UNH) Goalie
 27 Todd Francis (Cornell) Defense
 28 Jeff Hacker (Brown) Mid
 29 Dan O'Neil (Ohio Wesleyan) Goalie
 30 Barry Fraser (UNH) Attack

The general manager of the Militia was Chris Harvey and the head coach was David Hill.

References

Lacrosse teams in Boston